100268 Rosenthal, provisional designation , is a background asteroid from the inner region of the asteroid belt, approximately  in diameter. It was discovered on 5 October 1994, by German astronomer Freimut Börngen at the Karl Schwarzschild Observatory in Tautenburg, eastern Germany. The asteroid was later named for German radio and TV host Hans Rosenthal.

Orbit and classification 

Rosenthal is a non-family asteroid from the main belt's background population. It orbits the Sun in the inner asteroid belt at a distance of 2.0–2.9 AU once every 3 years and 10 months (1,392 days; semi-major axis of 2.44 AU). Its orbit has an eccentricity of 0.17 and an inclination of 12° with respect to the ecliptic. The body's observation arc begins with a precovery published by the Digitized Sky Survey. It was taken at the Siding Spring Observatory in September 1990, more than 4 years prior to its official discovery observation at Tautenburg.

Physical characteristics

Diameter estimate 

Based on its absolute magnitude of 15.6, its diameter is between 2 and 5 kilometers, assuming an albedo in the range of 0.05 to 0.25.

Since asteroids in the inner main-belt are often of a brighter silicaceous – rather than of a darker carbonaceous composition, with higher albedos, typically around 0.20, the asteroid's diameter might be on the lower end of NASA's published conversion table, as the lower the reflectivity (albedo), the larger the body's diameter for a given absolute magnitude.

As of 2018, Rosenthal effective size, shape, pole, spectral type and composition, as well as its albedo and rotation period remain unknown.

Naming 

This minor planet was named in honour of German radio and TV host Hans Rosenthal (1925–1987), a German Jew who survived the Holocaust as a boy inside Germany and became one of the country's most popular TV show masters ever in the early 1980s. He died of cancer at the age of 61. The approved naming citation was published by the Minor Planet Center on 13 April 2006.

References

External links 
 Asteroid Lightcurve Database (LCDB), query form (info )
 Dictionary of Minor Planet Names, Google books
 
 

100268
Discoveries by Freimut Börngen
Named minor planets
19941005